XMH or xmh may refer to:

 XMH, the IATA code for Manihi Airport, French Polynesia
 xmh, the ISO 639-3 code for Kuku-Muminh language, Queensland, Australia